Mount Earl Grey is a  mountain summit located in the Purcell Mountains of British Columbia, Canada. Nearby peaks include Truce Mountain,  to the west, Redtop Mountain,  to the southwest, and Jumbo Mountain,  to the north. In turn, the pass was named for Albert Grey, 4th Earl Grey (1851-1917), the Governor General of Canada from 1904 through 1911, who visited this pass during horseback camping trips in 1907 and 1908. The mountain's name was officially adopted March 31, 1924, when approved by the Geographical Names Board of Canada. The first ascent of Mount Earl Grey was made July 16, 1928, by E. Cromwell, J. G. Hillhouse, J. Monroe Thorington, and Conrad Kain.

Climate

Based on the Köppen climate classification, Mount Earl Grey is located in a subarctic climate zone with cold, snowy winters, and mild summers. Temperatures can drop below −20 °C with wind chill factors  below −30 °C. Precipitation runoff from the mountain drains into tributaries of Toby Creek, which in turn is a tributary of the Columbia River.

See also

Geography of British Columbia

References

External links
 Weather: Mount Earl Grey

Three-thousanders of British Columbia
Purcell Mountains
Columbia Country
Kootenay Land District